Alan Ralph Millard  (born 1 December 1937) is Rankin Professor Emeritus of Hebrew and Ancient Semitic languages, and Honorary Senior Fellow (Ancient Near East), at the School of Archaeology, Classics and Egyptology (SACE) in the University of Liverpool.

Millard worked on excavations at Tell Nebi Mend (ancient Qadesh-on-the-Orontes) and Tell Rif'at (ancient Arpad) in Syria, at Petra in Jordan, and at the Assyrian capital Nimrud (ancient Kalḫu) in Iraq. While working at the British Museum 1961–1964, he rediscovered the Epic of Atrahasis, which had lain unrecognised in a drawer for some decades. From 1964 to 1970 he was Librarian at Tyndale Library, Cambridge, and taught Akkadian for a year at the School of Oriental and African Studies (SOAS) in the University of London. In 1970 he was appointed Rankin Lecturer in Hebrew and Ancient Semitic Languages at Liverpool. He was a Fellow at the Institute of Advanced Studies (IAS) in the Hebrew University of Jerusalem in 1984, studying in a team led by Yigael Yadin. His main interest lies in Semitic epigraphy, and in editing Akkadian cuneiform tablets and Aramaic inscriptions. Scribal practices in the ancient Near East remain a dominant concern for him; the importance he ascribes to this topic stems largely from his belief as an Evangelical Christian in the essential historicity of the Bible – a point of view he shares with his colleague at Liverpool, the Egyptologist Kenneth Kitchen.

Millard is a Fellow of the Society of Antiquaries of London, a member of the Society for Old Testament Studies – and was also, until recently, Vice-Chairman of the British School of Archaeology in Iraq.

Publications
Atrahasis: The Babylonian Story of the Flood (with W.G. Lambert), Clarendon Press, Oxford (1969); reprinted Eisenbrauns, Winona Lake, Indiana,  (1999)

Daniel 1–6 and History (1977)

La Statue de Tell Fekherye et son inscription bilingue assyro-araméenne (with A. Abou-Assaf and P. Bordreuil), Association pour la diffusion de la pensée française, Paris (1982)
 Reprinted as: 
Discoveries from the Time of Jesus (1990)

The Eponyms of the Assyrian Empire, 910–612 BC, State Archives of Assyria Studies 2, The Neo-Assyrian Text Corpus Project, University of Helsinki (1994)
The Knowledge of Writing in Iron Age Palestine (1995)
Discoveries from Bible Times, Lion Publishing, Oxford (1997)
Dictionary of the Ancient Near East (edited, with Piotr Bienkowski), British Museum Press, London (2000)
Reading and Writing in the Time of Jesus, Sheffield Academic Press, Sheffield (2000)

See also
Assyriology
Garden of Eden

References

External links
Research Interests & Publication List from SACE website
Bibliography
The Alphabet: Its Creation and Development – appearance on the BBC Radio 4 discussion programme 'In Our Time' (2003)
Did Christ Leave a Paper Trail? – text of an interview with Millard (2004)
Writing and Ancient Near East Society: Papers in Honour of Alan R. Millard – a review in Journal of Hebrew Scriptures 7 (2007) of this festschrift, edited by Piotr Bienkowski, Christopher Mee and Elizabeth Slater, New York and London (2005)

1937 births
Living people
Academics of the University of Liverpool
Academics of SOAS University of London
British orientalists
English Assyriologists
British biblical scholars
Fellows of the Society of Antiquaries of London
Christian Hebraists
Employees of the British Museum
Old Testament scholars
Assyriologists